The Fabens Port of Entry was a port of entry at the Mexico–United States border, in the town of Fabens, Texas.  It closed on November 17, 2014, and traffic was diverted to the nearby Tornillo Port of Entry.  This facility was located at the Fabens–Caseta International Bridge, after that two-lane bridge was built by the International Boundary and Water Commission in 1938.

The port of Fabens was established by Executive Order 4869 on May 1, 1928, ten years prior to the construction of the first bridge, so it is likely there was once a ferry operation at this location.  The original port facility, built in 1938, was used as recently as the mid-1990s, when U.S. Customs and Border Protection (CBP) moved its operations to temporary buildings a short distance north of the bridge.

References

See also

 List of Mexico–United States border crossings
 List of Canada–United States border crossings

Mexico–United States border crossings
1938 establishments in Texas
2014 disestablishments in Texas